Far Out Man is a 1990 American comedy film written, directed by and starring Tommy Chong.

Plot
An aging hippie goes on a road trip in search of his long lost family. He meets up with his son (Paris Chong, Tommy's real-life son). Together they go off to see America. A majority of Tommy's real life family have roles; daughter Rae Dawn plays his daughter and wife Shelby has a lead role as his ex. Chong's former partner Cheech Marin makes a cameo appearance as a passenger in the back of Far Out Man's truck.

Cast
Tommy Chong as Far Out Man
C. Thomas Howell as himself
Rae Dawn Chong as herself
Shelby Chong as Tree
Paris Chong as Kyle
Martin Mull as Dr. Leddledick
Bobby Taylor as Bobby
Reynaldo Rey as Lou
Peggy McIntaggart as Misty (Peggy F. Sands)
Al Mancini as Fresno detective
Judd Nelson as himself
Cheech Marin as Cheech
Michael Winslow as airport cop
Lisa M. Hansen as police radio dispatcher
Cynthia Darlow as Truck Stop Waitress
Henry Kingi as Mean Indian
Rae Allen as Holly
Paul Bartel as Weebee Cool
Paul Hertzberg as Drunk man with wine

Production and release 
Labeled on promotional posters and in the opening credits as "A Tommy Chong Attempt", it was filmed in Los Angeles, California, USA. CineTel Films produced the movie and it was distributed in USA theaters by New Line Cinema, Sony Video (VHS), Platinum Disc (DVD), and RCA/Columbia Pictures Home Video (VHS). It was distributed in Germany by Ascot Video (VHS) and in Brazil by Odyssey (VHS). It was distributed in Canadian theaters by Alliance.

Floyd Sneed, former drummer of the rock group Three Dog Night, and brother of Chong's first wife Maxine Sneed, made a small cameo in the film as a drummer.

References

External links

 

1990 films
American independent films
CineTel Films films
1990 comedy films
Films directed by Tommy Chong
Films scored by Jay Chattaway
Stoner films
1990s English-language films
1990s American films